Rubén Adorno (born 3 August 1941 in Corozal) is a Puerto Rican former basketball player who competed in the 1964 Summer Olympics and in the 1968 Summer Olympics.

References

1941 births
Living people
People from Corozal, Puerto Rico
Puerto Rican men's basketball players
Olympic basketball players of Puerto Rico
Basketball players at the 1964 Summer Olympics
Basketball players at the 1968 Summer Olympics
Basketball players at the 1967 Pan American Games
Basketball players at the 1971 Pan American Games
Pan American Games medalists in basketball
Pan American Games silver medalists for Puerto Rico
Medalists at the 1971 Pan American Games